is a railway station on the Jōhana Line in city of Nanto, Toyama, Japan, operated by West Japan Railway Company (JR West).

Lines

Layout
The station has two opposed ground-level side platforms serving two tracks, connected to the station building by a level crossing. The station has a Midori no Madoguchi staffed ticket office.

Platforms

Adjacent stations

History
The station opened on 18 August 1897. With the privatization of Japanese National Railways (JNR) on 1 April 1987, the station came under the control of JR West.

Passenger statistics
In fiscal 2015, the station was used by an average of 570 passengers daily (boarding passengers only).

Surrounding area
Fukumitsu-Araki Post Office
YOshie Junior High School
Japan National Route 304

See also
 List of railway stations in Japan

References

External links

 

Railway stations in Toyama Prefecture
Stations of West Japan Railway Company
Railway stations in Japan opened in 1898
Jōhana Line
Nanto, Toyama